Chillupar is a constituency of the Uttar Pradesh Legislative Assembly covering the city of Chillupar in the Gorakhpur district of Uttar Pradesh, India.

Chillupar is one of five assembly constituencies in the Bansgaon Lok Sabha constituency. Since 2008, this assembly constituency is numbered 328 amongst 403 constituencies.

Members of the Legislative Assembly

Election results

2022

2017 
Bahujan Samaj Party candidate Vinay Shankar Tiwari, won in last Assembly election of 2017 Uttar Pradesh Legislative Elections by defeating Bharatiya Janta Party candidate Rajesh Tripathi by a margin of 3,359 votes.

References

External links
 

Assembly constituencies of Uttar Pradesh
Politics of Gorakhpur district